Taylor Dent was the defending champion but did not compete that year.

Robby Ginepri won in the final 6–4, 6–7 (3–7), 6–1 against Jürgen Melzer.

Seeds
A champion seed is indicated in bold text while text in italics indicates the round in which that seed was eliminated.

  James Blake (first round)
 n/a
  Mardy Fish (first round)
  Robby Ginepri (champion)
  Raemon Sluiter (first round)
  Brian Vahaly (first round)
  Justin Gimelstob (quarterfinals)
  Jürgen Melzer (final)

Draw

Tournament

References
 2003 Miller Lite Hall of Fame Championships Draw

2003 Hall of Fame Tennis Championships